The Bahamas National Open was a professional golf tournament on the PGA Tour in 1970 and 1971. It replaced the West End Classic, which had been a satellite Latin-American Tour stop, as the PGA's tournament in the Bahamas.

In 1970, the tournament was played as the Bahama Islands Open over the Emerald Course at Kings Inn & Golf Club in Freeport, Bahamas and won by Doug Sanders in a playoff. The following year, it was hosted at Lucayan Country Club in Freeport, Bahamas and won by Bob Goalby. The tournament appeared on the tour schedule again in 1972, but was cancelled.

Winners

References

Former PGA Tour events
Golf tournaments in the Bahamas
Freeport, Bahamas